The  is a mountain pass in Ōu Mountains on the Dewa Sendai Kaidō, a branch of the Ōshū Kaidō highway, which connected Sendai in what is now Miyagi Prefecture with Sakata in what is now Yamagata Prefecture on the Sea of Japan.  It was proclaimed a National Historic Site in 1990.

Overview
The route of the Edo period Dewa Sendai Kaidō is in parallel with the current Japan National Route 47 and the JR East Rikuu East Line, crossing the Ōu Mountains at the Nakayama Pass. This is a very ancient route, dating to the early Heian period when it was used to connect Taga Castle on the Pacific coast of Japan with Akita Castle on the Sea of Japan. The route was developed by the Tokugawa shogunate due to the development of copper mines in the area and was of great economic importance in connecting Sendai Domain with the kitamaebune coastal trade with western Japan. It was also the route taken by the famed haiku master, Matsuo Basho, on his journey from Hiraizumi to the Dewa Sanzan, as recounted in Oku no Hosomichi 

A section of the old highway with a total length of 4.2 kilometers from Naruko Onsen in Ōsaki, Miyagi to Sakaida in Mogami, Yamagata was designated as the  National Historical Site. It is about a 20 minute walk from Naruko-Onsen Station on the JR Rikuu East Line.

See also
List of Historic Sites of Japan (Miyagi)
List of Historic Sites of Japan (Yamagata)

References

External links
Cultural Assets of Yamagata 
Miyagi Prefectute site 
Osaki city site 

Mountain passes of Japan
Historic Sites of Japan
Landforms of Yamagata Prefecture
Landforms of Miyagi Prefecture
Mogami, Yamagata
Ōsaki, Miyagi